The 1975–76 Southern Hockey League season was the third season of the Southern Hockey League. The five existing teams returned from the previous season, joined by a sixth expansion team from Norfolk, Virginia. The Tidewater Sharks joined the league owned by Virginia politician Dick Davis, playing at the Norfolk Scope. The six teams played a complete schedule of 72 games, with the Charlotte Checkers winning the regular season, and the playoffs.

Standings
Final standings of the regular season.

WHA/NHL affiliations
Southern Hockey League franchises were primarily affiliated with World Hockey Association teams, however some also had agreements with National Hockey League teams. Summary of WHA/NHL affiliation agreements:

Scoring leaders
Top 10 SHL points scoring leaders.

Playoffs 
James Crockett Cup playoffs.

References

Southern
Southern Hockey League (1973–1977)